Ewen Douglas MacIntosh (born 25 December 1973) is a British actor and comedian known for his role as Keith Bishop in The Office (2001–2003).

Early life
MacIntosh was born in Merionethshire. He was educated at Repton School in Derbyshire, and studied linguistics at the University of Edinburgh. While at university, he was actively involved in the Edinburgh University Theatre Company and The Improverts.

Career
MacIntosh's big break in television came when he was cast as the deadpan accountant Keith Bishop in The Office. MacIntosh has also appeared on various shows such as Miranda and Little Britain. He formed a double act with Tim FitzHigham and they performed at the Edinburgh Fringe Festival in 2007. In 2009, MacIntosh appeared alongside several other celebrities in a charity music video for the Chris Rea song "Driving Home for Christmas". In early 2013, he prepared to play at a new West End show Geek! A New Musical at the Tristan Bates Theatre, which opened on 22 April 2013. He is also a regular on the radio sitcom Cabin Pressure, as Carl, the bored ATC operator. In 2013 he appeared in a national TV advert for ao.com. A year later he appeared as Barry the window cleaner in the film The Confusion of Tongues (2014).

In 2017, MacIntosh appeared as Lionel in British romantic comedy film Finding Fatimah.

MacIntosh appeared on Week 2 (Cheshire) of Celebrity Come Dine with Me in 2020, alongside Charlotte Crosby, Dawn Ward, Steven Arnold, and Jay Hutton.

MacIntosh has signed on with Salopian Films for the lead part in a new comedy six-part series called For the Love of Ella. The series also stars Lucy Drive, Alex Reid, Bobby Ball, Daniel Peacock, Melanie Sykes, Darren Day, Francoise Pascal and Billy Pearce. The script was written by Simon W. Golding (co-producer) and directed by James Farina (co-producer).

MacIntosh also presents various music programmes on Now 80s and Now 90s.

References

External links

Living people
1973 births
Welsh male television actors
Welsh male comedians
People educated at Repton School
Alumni of the University of Edinburgh